John Ward Greenwood (born 29 April 1934) was a member of the Queensland Legislative Assembly.

Biography
Greenwood was born in Kingsford, New South Wales, the son of Albert Francis Greenwood and his wife  Lila (née Ward). He was educated at various state schools across Queensland, New South Wales, and Victoria before attending Church of England Grammar School. He then graduated from the University of Queensland with a Bachelor of Arts in 1957 and a Bachelor of Laws in 1958.

He was admitted to the bar in 1958 and the next year was practicing as a barrister until 1976. He was also a part-time lecturer in commercial law 1962-1965 and a captain in Reserve Army Legal Corps.

Greenwood married Barbara Mary Ellen Conrad and together had a son and two daughters.

Public career
Greenwood took over the seat of Ashgrove from the retiring fellow Liberal, Doug Tooth, at the 1974 Queensland state election. He held Ashgrove until the state election in 1983, when he was defeated by the former international cricketer, Tom Veivers of the Labor Party.

He held many roles whilst in politics including:
 Minister for Survey, Valuation, Urban and Regional Affairs 1976-1977
 Minister for Survey and Valuation 1977-1980
 Member of the select committee on Subordinate Legislation 1975-1976
 Queensland Representative on the Australian Parliamentary Delegation to Canada 1976
 Delegate to the Australian Constitutional Convention 1976
 Member of the select committee on Privileges 1980
 Member of the Parliamentary Refreshment Rooms Committee 1980
 Member of the Parliamentary delegation to Asia  1981
 Delegate-elect to the Constitutional Convention 1983

References

Members of the Queensland Legislative Assembly
1934 births
Liberal Party of Australia members of the Parliament of Queensland
Living people